The Heart Never Lies is the eleventh studio album by American singer-songwriter Michael Martin Murphey. The album peaked at number 27 on the Billboard Top Country Albums chart.

Track listing
Tracklist are adapted from Discogs.

Credits
 Michael Martin Murphey – vocals, guitar, piano, harmonica
 Rafe Van Hoy – guitar
 John Leslie Hug – guitar
 Paul Worley – guitar, background vocals
 Randy Mitchell – guitar
 Josh Leo – guitar
 Carmen Acciaioli – steel guitar
 Mitch Humphries – piano
 Dennis Burnside – piano, background vocals
 Brian Whitcomb – keyboards
 Bryan Cummings – saxophone
 Byron Berline – violin
 Nick DeCaro – strings
 Jim Ed Norman – strings
 Alan Broadbent – strings
 Joe Osborn – bass
 Michael Bowden – bass
 Michael Huey – drums
 Matt Betton – drums
 Eddie Bayers – drums
 Victor Feldman – percussion
 Don Gant – background vocals
 Herb Pedersen – background vocals
 Linda Dillard – background vocals
 Joey Scarbury – background vocals
 Dennis Wilson – background vocals

Chart performance

References

External links
 Michael Martin Murphey's Official Website

1983 albums
Michael Martin Murphey albums
Liberty Records albums
Albums produced by Jim Ed Norman